A chaperon ( or ; Middle French: chaperon) was a form of hood or, later, highly versatile hat worn in all parts of Western Europe in the Middle Ages. Initially a utilitarian garment, it first grew a long partly decorative tail behind called a liripipe, and then developed into a complex, versatile and expensive headgear after what was originally the vertical opening for the face began to be used as a horizontal opening for the head.  It was especially fashionable in mid-15th century Burgundy, before gradually falling out of fashion in the late 15th century and returning to its utilitarian status.  It is the most commonly worn male headgear in Early Netherlandish painting, but its complicated construction is often misunderstood.

Humble origins

The chaperon began before 1200 as a hood with a short cape, put on by pulling over the head, or fastening at the front. The hood could be pulled off the head to hang behind, leaving the short cape round the neck and shoulders.  The edge of the cape was often trimmed, cut or scalloped for decorative effect. There were wool ones, used in cold weather, and lighter ones for summer.  In this form it continued through to the end of the Middle Ages, worn by the lower classes, often by women as well as men, and especially in Northern Europe. The hood was loose at the back, and sometimes ended in a tail that came to a point.

Terms and derivation

Chaperon is a diminutive of chape, which derives, like the English cap, cape and cope, from the Late Latin cappa, which already could mean cap, cape or hood (OED).

The tail of the hood, often quite long, was called the tippit or liripipe in English, and liripipe or cornette in French.  The cape element was a patte in French and in English cape, or sometimes cockscomb when fancily cut.  Later a round bourrelet (or rondel) could form part of the assemblage. Patte, cornette and bourrelet were the usual terms in the French of the 15th century Burgundian court, and are used here.  In Italian the equivalent terms were foggia, becchetto, and mazzocchio.

Chaperon was sometimes used in English, and also German, for both the hood and hat forms (OED).  But the word never appears in the Paston Letters, where there are many references to hats, hoods and bonnets for men.  As with all aspects of medieval costume, there are many contemporary images of clothing, and many mentions of names for clothing in contemporary documents, but definitively matching the names to the styles in the images is rarely possible.  In Italian the word was cappuccio [kap'put:ʃo], or its diminutive cappuccino, from which come the Capuchin friars, whose distinctive white hood and brown robe led to the monkey and the type of coffee being named after them (it also means the cap of a pen in Italian).

Little Red Riding Hood is Le Petit Chaperon rouge in the earliest published version, by Charles Perrault, and French depictions of the story naturally favour the chaperon over the long riding-hood of ones in English.

In French chaperon was also the term in falconry for the hood placed over a hawk's head when held on the hand to stop it wanting to fly away.  It is either this or the headgear meaning that later extended figuratively to become chaperon (in UK English, almost always chaperone) meaning a protective escort, especially for a woman.

Wearing variations

About 1300 the chaperon began to be worn by putting the hole intended for the face over the top of the head instead; perhaps in hot weather.  This left the cornette tail and the cape or patte,  hanging loose from the top of the head.  This became fashionable, and  chaperons began to be made to be worn in this style.  Some authorities only use the term chaperon for this type, calling the earlier forms hoods – which was certainly their usual name in English.  This is a categorisation for modern discussions only; there is no dispute over whether chaperon was the contemporary term.  See the wearing Colley-Weston-ward of the mandilion for an analogous development in a type of coat.

A padded  circular bourrelet (or rondel) evolved, which sat around the head, whilst the cornette became much longer, and gradually more scarf-like in shape, until by the 1430s it was usually straight at the sides and square-ended. Especially in Italy, the cornette was sometimes dispensed with, leaving just an un-flared tubular patte fixed to the bourrelet all round and hanging down to one side of the head. Reed (see refs) calls these sack hats.

By 1400–16, the period of the famous illuminated manuscripts of the Livre de Chasse of Gaston Phoebus (Bibliothèque Nationale, Paris Ms Français 616), and the  Très Riches Heures du Duc de Berry chaperons are to be seen worn by many figures. In the famous Calendar scenes of the Trés Riches Heures, they are worn in the original form by the peasants working in the fields, both men and women (February, March and September), and huntsmen (December), and in the new form by some of the courtiers (January and May), who wear coloured and scalloped ones, probably of silk.  However, the Duke himself, and the most prominent courtiers, do not wear them. In the Livre de Chasse they are most often worn by the lower huntsmen on foot in the original form, though they and mounted hunters also wear them on top of the head. Figures often have a hood chaperon and a hat as well. Only the original form (trimmed with fur in one case - fol.51V) is worn by the very highest-ranking figures.  

By the 1430s most chaperons had become simpler in the treatment of the cloth, and the cornette is long and plain, although the patte may still be elaborately treated with dagging. A perhaps overdressed courtier in a Van der Weyden workshop Exhumation of St Hubert (National Gallery, London NG 783) from this decade still has a very elaborately cut and dagged patte. A figure behind him is wearing his in church, which is unusual (both figures can be paralleled in the Seven Sacraments Altarpiece; see Gallery below).

Evolved chaperon

By the middle of the 15th century the evolved chaperon (worn on top of the head, with bourrelet) had become common wear for males in the upper and middle classes, and were worn in painted portraits, including those of the Dukes of Burgundy.  The amount of cloth involved had become considerable, and although chaperons seem to have normally been of a single colour at this period, a silk or damask one would have been a conspicuous sign of affluence. A Florentine chaperon of 1515 is recorded as using sixteen braccia of cloth, over ten yards (9 metres). 
Chaperons are nearly always shown in art as plain-coloured at this period, but painting a patterned one would have been a daunting task.

The cornette now stretched nearly to the ground, and the patte had also grown slightly; both were now plain and undecorated by cutting or dagging at the edges.  Bourrelets could be very large, or quite modest; some were clearly made round a hollow framework (a drawing survives of an Italian block for making them). The largest bourrelets are worn by very high ranking men around 1445–50.  Sometimes they seem to be just a ring (the doughnut analogy is hard to resist) with an open centre, and sometimes the opening seems to be at least partly covered with fixed cloth. Because the bourrelets were usually the same shape all the way round, several different parts of it could be worn facing forward.  Probably for this reason, chaperons are rarely seen adorned by badges or jewellery.  There were now many ways of wearing, and indeed carrying, this most complex and adaptable of hats:

A) the cornette and patte could be tied together on top of the head, to create a flamboyant turban-like effect, sometimes with a short tail of cornette or patte hanging to the rear.
B) the patte could be looped under the chin and tied or pinned to the bourrelet on the other side of the face, whilst the cornette hung behind or in front, or was tied on top.
C) the patte could be worn to the loose to the rear, with the cornette tied on top, or hanging loose to front or rear.
D) conversely the patte could be tied above, whilst the cornette hung loose to front or rear.
E) the patte could be worn to the rear, loose or tucked into the other clothes at the back of the neck, whilst the cornette was wrapped round over the top of the head and under the chin a couple of times and secured.  This was suitable for cold or windy weather, especially when riding.
F) when the chaperon needed to be removed, in warm weather, or in the presence of a person much higher in rank (and, usually, in church) it could be put over the shoulder with the patte and cornette hanging on opposite sides, or round the shoulders.  Which came forward and which went back varies considerably, but more often the bourrelet went behind.  Possibly the chaperon was secured to the shoulder, as the assemblage often looks rather precarious.  Donor figures in religious paintings always wear their chaperons in this way, as they are figuratively in the presence of the saints or the Madonna.

Examples of these styles are shown in the illustrations to the article and in the Gallery section below.

The height of fashion

The only surviving manuscript miniature by Rogier van der Weyden shows Philip the Good wearing a chaperon in style B. Next to him stands Chancellor Nicolas Rolin, using a less exuberant version of style B; only he has sufficient status to wear his chaperon indoors in the Duke's presence. Apart from the Bishop of Tournai, next to Rolin, all the other men are bare-headed, even Philip's young heir, despite the fact that several of them are high-ranking intimates who, like the Duke, wear the collar of the Order of the Golden Fleece. But as far as can be seen, all have hats.  The man in grey seems to be carrying another sort of hat, but all the other ones visible are chaperons worn in style F, mostly with the cornettes to the front. The young Charles the Bold has his patte wrapped round the back of his neck, and the man on the extreme right has his bourrelet further than usual down his back, with the patte hanging down from it. Most of the chaperons are black, although the man in blue has one in salmon-pink; black was having one of its earliest periods of being the most fashionable colour at the time.

The chaperon never became quite this dominant in Italy or France; nor does it seem to have been worn as often by grand personages, although this is sometimes the case.  There is a famous bust of Lorenzo de Medici wearing one, although in this he may be deliberately avoiding ostentatious dress (see gallery section).  They are more characteristic of merchants and lawyers in these countries, for example in the images of Jean Fouquet from the mid-century. In England, on the other hand, almost all the non-royal members of the Order of the Garter are shown wearing them in their portraits in "William Bruges' Garter Book" of 1430–1440 (British Library, Stowe MS 594). In the Holy Roman Empire, Spain and Portugal they were generally less common, & appeared lower down the social scale. They were apparently never worn by the clergy anywhere.

Political chaperons
Chaperons were used in France and Burgundy to denote, by their colour, allegiance to a political faction.  The factions themselves were also sometimes known as chaperons.  During the captivity in England of King John II of France in 1356, the participants in a popular uprising in Paris against his son, the future Charles V, wore parti-coloured chaperons of red, for Paris, and blue for Navarre as they supported the claim to the French throne of King Charles the Bad of Navarre.    In 1379 the ever-difficult citizens of Ghent rose up against Duke Philip the Bold of Burgundy wearing white chaperons.  White was also worn in factional disturbances in Paris in 1413, by opponents of the Armagnacs, during one of King Charles VI's bouts of madness.

The chaperon was one of the items of male clothing that featured in the charges brought against Joan of Arc at her trial in 1431. This was apparently a hat rather than a hood, as she was stated to have taken it off in front of the Dauphin – this was cited as further damning evidence of her assuming male behaviours.

In 15th century Florence, cappucci were associated with republicans, as opposed to courtiers (see gallery). An advisor to the Medici told them in 1516 that they should get as many young men to wear "the courtier's cap" rather than the cappucci.  Part of the connotation seems to arise because the chaperon was too complicated to be taken off on meeting one of higher rank (in Florence at any rate); it was merely touched or pushed back on the head slightly.

The cappuccio in Renaissance art

In addition to being featured in many Renaissance portraits by virtue of being the fashion of the day, the Italian cappuccio was of interest because the mazzocchio's shape made it a good subject for the developing art of perspective. The painter Paolo Uccello studied the perspective of the mazzocchio and incorporated it in some of his paintings (e.g. in The Counterattack of Michelotto da Cotignola at the Battle of San Romano).

Apart from portraits, many of the best, and least formal, depictions of the chaperon in art come from paintings of the Nativity and other scenes of the early life of Christ.  It is of course always winter, when the chaperon was most likely to be worn.  Saint Joseph is especially useful, as it is never part of his depiction to be fashionably dressed, and it is part of his character in the period that he is often shown quite dishevelled (see examples below).  The shepherds are the lower-class figures most often shown in a large scale in paintings of the period.

Decline
By about 1480 the chaperon was ceasing to be fashionable, but continued to be worn.  The size of the bourrelet was reduced, and the patte undecorated.  St Joseph could, by this stage, often be seen with the evolved form. By 1500 the evolved chaperon was definitely outmoded in Northern Europe, but the original hood form still remained a useful headgear for shepherds and peasants.  By this time the evolved chaperon had become fixed in some forms of civilian uniforms for lawyers, academics and the members of some knightly orders, such as the Order of the Garter. In these uses it gradually shrank in size and often became permanently attached to the clothing underneath, effectively just as an ornament, in its present form, as a part of academic dress, called an epitoge.  In Italy it remained more current, more as a dignified form of headgear for older men, until about the 1520s.

Funerary ornaments on horses
In a later related use of the term, the name  passed to certain little shields, or escutcheons, and other funeral devices, placed on the foreheads of horses that drew the hearses to processional funerals. These were called  or shafferoons, as they were originally fastened to the chaperonnes, or hoods, worn by those horses with their other coverings of state.  (See also Frentera.)

Gallery

References
SD Reed, From Chaperones to Chaplets:Aspects of Men's Headdress 1400–1519, M.S. Thesis, 1992, University of Maryland -NB Headgear Reed categorises as Hoods, Chaperones, & (some) Sack Hats are all covered by this article.
J.O. Hand & M. Wolff, Early Netherlandish Painting, National Gallery of Art, Washington (catalogue) /Cambridge UP,1986, 
National Gallery Catalogues: The Fifteenth Century Italian Paintings, Volume 1, by Dillian Gordon, London, 2003, 
Gabriel Bise, The Hunting Book by Gaston Phoebus, Heritage Books, London, 
Edmond Pognon, Les Trés Riches Heures du Duc de Berry, Liber
M. Vibbert, Headdresses of the 14th and 15th Centuries, The Compleat Anachronist, No. 133, SCA monograph series (August 2006)

Notes

External links

History of the chaperon, with simple diagrams
Chaperon section of 1929 book by Adrien Harmond - in French, with many pictures and reconstructed cutting patterns
CORSAIR database from the Morgan Library - search for chaperon gives 25 results from 2 French manuscripts, 1420–35
Le Livre de Chasse of Gaston Phoebus, c 1400, from Ms Fr 616 from the Biblitheque Nationale, Paris. Feature with many illustrations, texts in French.
Another stylish chaperon by Pisanello, from a medal in the NGA, Washington
The NGA bust of Lorenzo de Medici, after restoration
15th and early 16th Century Headress: A Literature Review -updated (1997) section from SD Reed thesis above
Some related headresses of the 15th Century: theories on construction by Cynthia du Pré Argent

Hats
Dutch clothing
History of clothing (Western fashion)
Hoods (headgear)
Death customs
Horse tack
Medieval European costume